Kaliro District is a district in the Eastern Region of Uganda. It was created out of the eastern part of Kamuli District in 2006. Kaliro is the site of the district headquarters.

Location 
Kaliro District borders Serere District to the north, across Lake Nakuwa, one, of the lakes that comprise the Lake Kyoga water complex. Pallisa District lies to the northeast, Namutumba District to the southeast, Iganga District to the south, Luuka District to the southwest, and Buyende District to the northwest.

Population
In 1991, the national population census estimated the population of the district at 105,100. The 2002 Uganda national census put the population at approximately 154,700, of whom 49.5 percent were males and 50.5 percent were females. The annual population growth rate was calculated at 3.5%. In 2012, the population of Kaliro District was estimated at 216,500.

See also
Busoga sub-region
Districts of Uganda

References

External links
 Kaliro District Homepage

 
Busoga
Districts of Uganda
Eastern Region, Uganda
Lake Kyoga